Jesse Ewart (born 31 July 1994) is an Australian-born Irish cyclist, who currently rides for UCI Continental team .

Major results

2016
 4th Overall Tour de Filipinas
 10th Overall Jelajah Malaysia
1st  Young rider classification
2017
 3rd Overall Tour de Molvccas
 8th Overall Tour de Flores
2018
 1st  Overall Tour de Singkarak
1st Stage 3
 2nd Overall Tour de Ijen
1st Stage 3
 10th Overall Tour of Indonesia
2019
 1st  Overall Tour de Singkarak
1st Stages 1 & 2
 3rd Overall Tour de Ijen
 4th Overall Tour of Indonesia
 7th Overall Tour of Iran (Azerbaijan)
2020
 2nd Malaysian International Classic Race
 4th Grand Prix Velo Alanya
 6th Overall Herald Sun Tour
2021
 5th Road race, Australian National Road Championships
2022
 3rd Overall Tour du Rwanda

References

External links

1994 births
Living people
Australian male cyclists
Irish male cyclists
Sportspeople from Newcastle, New South Wales
Cricketers from New South Wales
20th-century Australian people
21st-century Australian people
20th-century Irish people
21st-century Irish people